These are the full results of the 2002 European Cup Super League which was held on 22 and 23 June 2002 at the Parc des Sports in Annecy, France.

Final standings

Men's results

100 metres
22 JuneWind: +0.2 m/s

200 metres
23 JuneWind: -0.4 m/s

400 metres
22 June

800 metres
23 June

1500 metres
22 June

3000 metres
23 June

5000 metres
22 June

110 metres hurdles
23 JuneWind: +0.7 m/s

400 metres hurdles
22 June

3000 metres steeplechase
23 June

4 × 100 metres relay
22 June

4 × 400 metres relay
23 June

High jump
22 June

Pole vault
23 June

Long jump
22 June

Triple jump
23 June

Shot put
22 June

Discus throw
23 June

Hammer throw
22 June

Javelin throw
23 June

Women's results

100 metres
22 JuneWind: +0.4 m/s

200 metres
23 JuneWind: +0.6 m/s

400 metres
22 June

800 metres
22 June

1500 metres
23 June

3000 metres
22 June

5000 metres
23 June

100 metres hurdles
23 JuneWind: -0.2 m/s

400 metres hurdles
22 June

3000 metres steeplechase
23 June

4 × 100 metres relay
22 June

4 × 400 metres relay
23 June

High jump
23 June

Pole vault
22 June

Long jump
23 June

Triple jump
22 June

Shot put
23 June

Discus throw
22 June

Hammer throw
23 June

Javelin throw
22 June

References

European Cup Super League
European
European Cup Super League
European Cup Super League
International athletics competitions hosted by France
Sport in Annecy